Dallas Wiebe (1930–2008) was an American writer, poet, and a professor of English.  He is best known for his 1969 controversial novel, Skyblue the Badass. The Newton, Kansas native was also a founder of the writing program at the University of Cincinnati, where he served as professor emeritus in the Department of English from 1963 until 1995.
Some of his other works include "Night Flight to Stockholm," The Transparent Eyeball, Down the River: A Collection of Ohio Valley Fiction and Poetry, "Skyblue on the Dump", "Skyblue's Memoirs," Our Asian Journey, Going to the Mountain, The Kansas Poems and The Vox Populi Stories.

Early life and education
Wiebe was born in Newton, Kansas. He completed his undergraduate education at Bethel College. He attended graduate school at the University of Michigan, where he co-founded the "John Barton Wolgamot Society".

Career 
Wiebe's career as a professor began at the University of Wisconsin in 1960. He left the University of Wisconsin in 1963 and went to the University of Cincinnati as an assistant professor of English. Wiebe wrote Skyblue the Badass between 1963 and 1967, and it was published in 1969.

In 1968, Wiebe initiated creative writing courses at the University of Cincinnati, which paved the way for the creation of the University's Creative Writing Program in 1976. Wiebe taught in the program from its inception until 1993 and served as director for eight years. In addition, Wiebe served as literary adviser for the University's literary magazine, PROFILE.

Wiebe co-founded the Cincinnati Poetry Review in 1975  and served as its editor. He also co-founded the Cincinnati Writer's Project (CWP) in 1987.

He continued to write and publish works throughout his life. He retired from university work in 1995.

Skyblue on the Dump censorship issue 
In 1967, New Yorker Carl Gorton happened to read Wiebe's short story, "Skyblue on the Dump" in Farmington Public Library's copy of The Paris Review #39. Disturbed by the content of the story, Gorton removed the magazine from the library, which was against library policy. The removal was reported in The New York Times, where Gorton was quoted as stating that the story "'should not be available to minors" or made available "at the expenditure of taxpayers' dollars."'

Gorton was later elected to the Farmingdale library board, where he printed and distributed a scene from the story to support his views about the library budget. The editor of The Paris Review, George Plimpton, denounced the censoring of the magazine in the June 1967 New York Newsday article titled "Literary Lion Roars Back." Students from the State University of New York-Farmingdale publicly protested the censorship outside of the South Farmingdale library branch.

Works 
Wiebe's works, in order by date of publication
 "Sonnet," published in The Paris Review, 1963
 In the Late Gnat Night, 1965
 "Skyblue on the Dump," published in The Paris Review, 1966
 Skyblue the Badass, 1969
 "Night Flight to Stockholm," published in The Paris Review, 1978, and included in the 2912 anthology Object Lessons.
 The Transparent Eyeball: Stories, 1982
 The Transparent Eyeball, 1984
 The Kansas Poems, 1987
 Going to the Mountain, 1988
 Skyblue's Essays, 1995
 Our Asian Journey, 1997
 Skyblue's Memoirs, finished in 1972, excerpts published in 2003
 The Vox Populi Stories, 2003
 The Saying of Abraham Nofziger: A Guide for the Perplexed, 2004
 The Notebook of Laura Bonair: and other stories, 2005
 Fer Fio's Journey, 2005
 The Nofziger Letters, 2005
 On the Cross: Devotional Poems, 2005
 The Nofziger Letters II, 2006
 The White Book of Life, 2006
 The Sayings of Abraham Nofziger II: An Enchiridion for the Pious, 2007
 Monument: On Aging and Dying, 2008

Edited:
Down the River: A Collection of Ohio Valley Fiction and Poetry, 1991

Unpublished:
Slapsticks (a portion of this work was published in 1999)

Awards 

 The Agha Khan Fiction Award, for his short story "Night Flight to Stockhold" published in The Paris Review
 1998 Governor's Award for Individual Artist
 Individual Artists Grant from the Ohio Arts Council, for a portion of his unpublished work Slapsticks
 Pushcart Prize

References 

1930 births
2008 deaths
20th-century American writers
University of Cincinnati faculty
21st-century American writers
American male poets
University of Michigan alumni
20th-century American male writers
American Mennonites
Mennonite writers
Mennonite poets